Dressleria is a genus of flowering plants from the orchid family, Orchidaceae native to South and Central America.

Species
Species include:

 Dressleria allenii
 Dressleria aurorae
 Dressleria bennettii
 Dressleria dilecta
 Dressleria dodsoniana
 Dressleria eburnea
 Dressleria fragrans
 Dressleria helleri
 Dressleria kalbreyeri
 Dressleria kerryae
 Dressleria morenoi
 Dressleria severiniana
 Dressleria williamsiana

See also 
 List of Orchidaceae genera

References 

  (1975) Selbyana 1(2): 131. 
 . Handbuch der Orchideen-Namen. Dictionary of Orchid Names. Dizionario dei nomi delle orchidee. Ulmer, Stuttgart
  (Eds)  (2009) Genera Orchidacearum Volume 5: Epidendroideae (Part 2): Epidendroideae, 26 ff. Oxford: Oxford University Press.

External links 

 
Catasetinae genera